Copper River Census Area is a census area located in the state of Alaska, United States. It is part of the Unorganized Borough and therefore has no borough seat. On January 2, 2019, it was split from the Valdez–Cordova Census Area, along with neighboring Chugach Census Area.

As of the 2020 census, the census area had a population of 2,617; its largest communities are the census-designated places of Glennallen and Copper Center.

It is named after Copper River that has rich fish and flows through the census area.

Demographics
According to the 2010 United States Census (in which it was reported as the "Copper River Census Subarea"), the census area had a population of 2,952; 2,229 (75.5%) of whom were over the age of 18, and 321 (10.9%) of whom were over the age of 65. 2,032 residents (68.8%) were reported as White alone (2,020/68.4% non-Hispanic white), 11 (0.4%) as Black, 678 (23.0%) as American Indian or Alaska Native, 11 (0.4%) as Asian, 13 (0.4%) as Native Hawaiian or other Pacific Islander, 5 (0.2%) as some other race, and 202 (6.9%) as two or more races. 53 people (1.8%) were Hispanic or Latino (they may be of any of the above racial categories).

Communities

Census-designated places

 Chisana
 Chistochina
 Chitina
 Copper Center
 Gakona
 Glennallen
 Gulkana
 Kenny Lake
 McCarthy
 Mendeltna
 Mentasta Lake
 Nabesna
 Nelchina
 Paxson
 Silver Springs
 Slana
 Tazlina
 Tolsona
 Tonsina
 Willow Creek

Other places
 Copperville (former CDP)
Many of these communities lie on Alaska Route 1 and 4.

References

Alaska census areas
 
Ahtna